Türkəkəran (also, Tyurkyakeran) is a village and municipality in the Lankaran Rayon of Azerbaijan.  It has a population of 1,170.

References 

Populated places in Lankaran District